Malaviya Regional Engineering College, Jaipur is one of thirteen premium engineering colleges in India that came up with five Indian Institute of Technology to promote quality technical education in India. In 2002, it was renamed to Malaviya National Institute of Technology, Jaipur.

Engineering colleges in Jaipur
Memorials to Madan Mohan Malaviya